Xiangtan is a prefecture-level city in east-central Hunan province, south-central China. The hometowns of several founding leaders of the Chinese Communist Party, including Chairman Mao Zedong, President Liu Shaoqi, and Marshal Peng Dehuai, are in Xiangtan's administration, as well as the hometowns of Qing dynasty  and republic era painter Qi Baishi, scholar-general Zeng Guofan, and tennis player Peng Shuai. 

Xiangtan forms a part of the Greater Changsha Metropolitan Region with Changsha as the core city along with Zhuzhou, also known as Changzhutan City Cluster, one of the core cities in Central China. 

Xiangtan is one of the top 500 cities in the world by scientific research outputs, as tracked by the Nature Index. It is home to Xiangtan University, a new Double First Class university and two provincial key public universities of Hunan Institute of Engineering and Hunan University of Science and Technology.

Geography 
Xiangtan is located on the lower reaches of the Xiang River.

Etymology
The name "Xiangtan" is derived from local geography, though there are several explanations for its origin vary somewhat in details.  In any case, "Xiang" refers to the Xiang River, while "Tan" is a Chinese term that means "deep pool", specifically one produced by a moving current or waterfall; "Tan" in rivers generally are places where the current eddies.  One reasoning is that the city was built by a large eddy in a bend of the Xiang River, and was thus called "Xiang-Tan".  Another more likely story says the name originated in the Xiangzhou Eddy, today called the Zhao Eddy.  The Zhao Eddy is an ancient whirlpool located in a deep section of the Xiang River near the traditional border between Xiangtan and Changsha, and is named for King Zhao of Zhou, who is said to have died there.

History

Pre-Ming Dynasty
Relics from the Daxi culture indicate that people inhabited the Xiangtan area in the 3rd millennium BC.  Shang Dynasty bronzewares have been found in the region, as well as tombs from the Warring States period.  During the Three Kingdoms Period, the kingdom of Eastern Wu built a city in the west of modern Xiangtan City and organized the Hengyang Commandery around it.  In 749, the Tang Dynasty organized the area as Xiangtan County, centered at modern Yisu River.  By the time of the Northern Song Dynasty, Xiangtan's good access to both land and water trade routes had established it as the major commercial center of the region.

Ming and Qing Dynasties
Xiangtan prospered throughout the Ming Dynasty and Qing Dynasty upon an economic foundation of trading in rice and traditional Chinese medicinal ingredients, and was sometimes referred to as "Little Nanjing" or "Golden Xiangtan".  Prior to the Second Opium War, Xiangtan was a central transfer point for import and export goods going to and from ports in Canton, Shanghai, and Wuhan, supported by approximately 200,000 inhabitants.

Population 
As of 2010 census, Xiangtan had 2,748,552 inhabitants, of whom 1,877,919 lived in the built-up area (2 urban districts plus Xiangtan county). Together with the four adjoining urban districts of Zhuzhou, its built-up area is home to 2,933,069 inhabitants. In 2007, the city was named China's top ten livable cities by Chinese Cities Brand Value Report, which was released at the 2007 Beijing Summit of China Cities Forum.

Geography and climate 

Xiangtan has a humid subtropical climate with long, hot summers, and cool to cold, cloudy, damp winters with occasional snow flurries.

Administrative divisions 
The city of Xiangtan has direct jurisdiction over two districts, two county-level cities, and one county  :
 Yuetang District
 Yuhu District
 Shaoshan City
 Xiangxiang City
 Xiangtan County

Economy 
In 2006, Xiangtan's nominal GDP was ¥42.2 billion (US$6.2 billion), a year-on-year growth of 13.2% from the previous year. Its per capita GDP was ¥15,455 (US$2,265).

Xiangtan is famous for its production of lotus seed and soy sauce. People in Xiangtan like to chew areca nut, though the area itself doesn't grow them. Most raw areca nut fruits are from Hainan and processed locally. The history of consuming areca nut dates back to 400 years ago, when people chewed it for pandemic prevention. Nowadays, it is quite common to see people chewing areca nut in Hunan. In 2003, the sales revenue of areca nut industry in Xiangtan had reached ¥800 million.

Government

The current CPC Party Secretary of Xiangtan is Cao Jiongfang and the current Mayor is Zhang Yingchun.

Transportation 
Xiangtan is well connected by roads, river and rail. There is a shuttle bus service connecting to Changsha Huanghua International Airport.

Tourism 
Many people continue to visit Shaoshan, Xiangtan to visit the birthplace of Mao Zedong, the former Chairman of the Communist Party of China and the paramount leader of the People's Republic of China from 1949 to 1976.

Some local people like to visit zhaoshan, a small mountain surrounded by trees in Xiangtan.

Sports 
Professional tennis player Peng Shuai was born and trained in Xiangtan. Xiangtan Stadium was the home to Bayi Football Team of the Chinese Football Association Jia League (now Chinese Super League) from 2002 to 2003.

Colleges and universities 
This is a list of institutions with full-time bachelor programs in Xiangtan:
 Xiangtan University
 Hunan University of Science and Technology
 Hunan Institute of Engineering

Notable locals 
Xiangtan is the birthplace of:
Mao Zedong
Mao Yichang
Mao Ning
Peng Dehuai
Qi Baishi
Zeng Guofan
James Soong
Tang Hongbo
Peng Shuai
Ma Ho-ling
Ma Ying-jeou

See also 
 List of Catholic dioceses in China
 List of twin towns and sister cities in China

Notes

External links 

Xiangtan Hi-tech Industrial Development Zone
German Industrial Park

 
Cities in Hunan
Prefecture-level divisions of Hunan